The UK Indie Chart is a weekly chart that ranks the biggest-selling singles that are released on independent record labels in the United Kingdom. The chart is compiled by the Official Charts Company, and is based on both physical and digital single sales. Nineteen different singles reached the number-one spot during 2010.

Summary

"Kickstarts" by Example currently holds the record for most weeks spent at number one during 2010. It remained at the top for ten consecutive weeks from 20 June to 22 August and also peaked at number three on the UK Singles Chart. This marked Example's second number-one indie single, as previous single "Won't Go Quietly" had also reached the top spot on 7 February, where it had remained for four weeks. This brought Example's total to 14 weeks at number one.

During 2010, eleven acts earned their first indie number one, either as a lead or featured artist. They were: Sidney Samson, Wizard Sleeve, Example, Steve Aoki, Skepta, Fugative, Leeds United Team & Supporters, Katy B, Pepper & Piano, Emma's Imagination and Tim Berg.

Several singles returned to number one throughout 2010. The first was Sidney Samson's "Riverside (Let's Go)", which topped the chart first on 10 January and remained at the top for four consecutive weeks. The single returned to the top spot on 7 March for a single week and then for a third time on 2 May, bringing the total number of weeks at the peak to six. Skepta also returned to number one on 8 April for a single week after peaking on 21 March, where it spent two weeks at the top. On 29 August, Katy B's debut single "Katy On a Mission" topped the chart, spending a single week at the peak. The single then returned to number one on 12 September, where it stayed for two weeks. It then returned for a third time on 16 October, bringing its total to four weeks at the peak.

On 5 September 2010, Pepper & Piano reached number one on the chart. The duo featured on the first semi-final of the TV talent show, Must Be the Music. Two weeks later, Emma's Imagination, the ultimate winner of the competition, also topped the chart, which marked a second number-one single to come from the programme.

Chart history

Year-end statistics
 Best-selling number-one indie single – "Riverside (Let's Go)" by Sidney Samson featuring Wizard Sleeve (384,000 single sales)
 Best-selling number-one indie artist – Example (708,000 single sales)
 Most weeks at number one (single, consecutive) – "Kickstarts" by Example (10 weeks)
 Most weeks at number one (single, non-consecutive) – "Make You Feel My Love" by Adele (8 weeks)
 Most weeks at number one (artist, consecutive) – Example (10 weeks)
 Most weeks at number one (artist, non-consecutive) – Example (14 weeks)

Number-one artists

See also
List of number-one singles of 2010 (UK)
List of UK Dance Chart number-one singles of 2010
List of UK Indie Chart number-one albums of 2010
List of UK Official Download Chart number-one singles of 2010
List of UK Rock Chart number-one singles of 2010
List of UK R&B Chart number-one singles of 2010

References

External links
Independent Singles Chart at the Official Charts Company
UK Top 30 Indie Singles Chart at BBC Radio 1

Number-one indie singles
UK Indie Singles
Indie 2010